Beyzanur Aslan (born 28 September 2001) is an Azerbaijaniani professional footballer, who plays for the Istanbul-based club Fenerbahçe S.K. in the Turkish Women's Football Super League.

Private life
Beyzanur Aslan was born on 28 September 2000. She grew up in Antalya, Turkey.

Club career
Aslan started her career as a defender in the youth team of 1207 Antalya Spor. She played in the A-team of her hometome club in the Turkish Women's First Football League, before she transferred to the newly established Istanbul-based club Fenerbahçe.

International career
In 2017, she accepted the offer of  the Association of Football Federations of Azerbaijan to join the Azerbaijan women's national football team.

She played for the Azerbaijan girls' U-17 and the women's U-19 national teams.

Career statistics

References

2001 births
Living people
Citizens of Azerbaijan through descent
Azerbaijani women's footballers
Women's association football defenders
Sportspeople from Antalya
Turkish women's footballers
1207 Antalya Spor players
Fenerbahçe S.K. women's football players
Turkish Women's Football Super League players
Turkish people of Azerbaijani descent
Sportspeople of Azerbaijani descent